Chen Yuqi (born 29 July 1992), also known as Yukee Chen, is a Chinese actress.  She is known for her supporting roles in The Princess Weiyoung and Ashes of Love and her lead role as Zhao Min in Heavenly Sword and Dragon Slaying Sabre and her lead role as Chong Xue Zhi in And the Winner is Love.

Early life and education
Chen Yuqi was born Chen Qian on 29 July 1992 in Chengdu. She studied performing arts at the Jincheng College of Sichuan University. After her graduation, Chen worked as an extra in Hengdian World Studios.

Career

2015–2018: Beginnings
In 2015, while working as an extra on the set of movie A Chinese Odyssey Part Three, Chen was spotted by actress Tiffany Tang and subsequently became one of the first batch of actors signed onto Tang's studio.

In 2016, Chen gained recognition for her role as a sassy and adorable princess in the historical drama The Princess Weiyoung, produced by Tiffany Tang's studio. For her performance, she won the Newcomer award at the China Television Drama Quality Ceremony. 
The same year, she starred in the wuxia web film Man Hunter playing one of the lead roles.

In 2017, Chen was cast in her first leading role in the fantasy web drama Private Shushan Gakuen alongside Wang Yibo. She then starred in the campus drama Fresh Teachers, playing a supporting role as one of the students.

In 2018, Chen starred in the hit fantasy romance drama Ashes of Love, portraying a powerful demon princess.

2019–present: Rising popularity
In 2019, Chen starred as one of the female leads in the 2019 wuxia drama Heavenly Sword and Dragon Slaying Sabre based on the novel of the same name by Jin Yong. Her role as the beloved character of Zhao Min earned her rave reviews from critics and further bolstered her acting career.

In 2020, Chen starred in the historical romance drama The Love Lasts Two Minds alongside Yu Menglong, playing two roles. The same year, she starred in the wuxia romance drama And The Winner Is Love alongside Luo Yunxi, portraying the naive female lead Chong Xue Zhi.

She is set to star in her first republican-themed drama, Mystery of Antiques III based on the novel of the same name by Ma Boyong.

Filmography

Film

Television series

Awards and nominations

References

External links 
 
 

Living people
1992 births
Chinese film actresses
Chinese television actresses
21st-century Chinese actresses
Actresses from Chengdu